The CODA System is a role-playing game system designed by Decipher, Inc.

Description
After Last Unicorn Games was purchased by Wizards of the Coast some of the staff from Last Unicorn started working for Decipher, Inc. where they created their Star Trek Roleplaying Game, which used the CODA System. The CODA System was also used, in an altered form, in their Lord of the Rings Roleplaying Game. It was published in two 256-page hardcover books.

It uses six-sided dice to resolve actions. It uses a set of character statistics, as well as skills and edges, that function similarly to the d20 System 'Feats' systems.  Characters belong to a class, and can adopt more than one class as they progress.

The CODA System has characters advancing and refers to characters as having N advancements, similar to having a particular level in the d20 System.  Advancing gives the player a number of picks with which to buy upgrades to their character's statistics and abilities.

Characters have a total hit point pool segmented into health levels; each health level of damage incurred imposes a wound penalty to certain actions.  Characters also have a number of 'weariness' levels; extended or intense activity can result in penalties to certain actions based on the number of weariness levels lost.

References

Role-playing game systems
Decipher, Inc. games